The Combat Service Support Battalion (Estonian: Lahinguteeninduspataljon) of the 2nd Infantry Brigade is a battalion size regular military unit of the Estonian Land Forces with combat service support role. The CCS Battalion is located in South Eastern Estonia and provides rear support including medical service for the units of the Brigade and Võru Battle School.

History
The CSS Battalion was created along with the formation of 2nd Infantry Brigade and reorganization of Southern Defence District in 2014. That was a part of the Military reform of the Estonian Defence Forces in order to create two maneuverable brigade size units instead of four static defence districts.

Organisation
The structure of the CSS Battalion includes:
        
 Headquarters
 Supply Group
 Repair Team
 Transport Group
 Medical Centre
After mobilization team and groups would expand to companies. It is important to notice that there are no conscripts in this Battalion in peacetime.

Garrison
The CSS Battalion is located in Taara Army Base, Võru town along with Kuperjanov Infantry Battalion and Voru NCO school.

See also
2nd Infantry Brigade of Estonian Land Forces
CSS Battalion of the 1st Infantry Brigade
Logistics Battalion of the Support Command

References

External links
Official website

Battalions of Estonia
Military units and formations established in 2014
Võru County